Galinsoga formosa is a rare Mexican species of flowering plant in the family Asteraceae. It has been found only the State of Oaxaca in southwestern Mexico.

Description
Each head has 5-15 white (sometimes with a purplish underside) ray flowers surrounding up to 100 yellow disc flowers.

References

formosa
Flora of Oaxaca
Plants described in 1973